The Sustained Dialogue Institute, founded by Harold H. Saunders and incorporated in 2002, is an independent tax-exempt 501 (c)(3) organization formed in collaboration with the Kettering Foundation. The institute provides trainings, consulting, and technical support for the Sustained Dialogue process on campuses, workplaces, and communities around the globe. Sustained Dialogue is system for transforming conflictual or destructive relationships, and implementing long-term change, developed from Hal Saunders' experience facilitating peace processes in the Middle East as a United States diplomat.

The Sustained Dialogue Institute houses the Sustained Dialogue System process and the Sustained Dialogue Campus Network.

Sustained Dialogue System 
Sustained dialogue is a process for transforming deep-rooted human conflicts. Former United States Assistant Secretary of State for Near East Affairs Hal Saunders developed the process, which is rooted in his experience in facilitating peace processes, including the Camp David Accords and the Iran Hostage Crisis. During the Cold War, the Sustained Dialogue System served as the underlying philosophy of the Dartmouth Conferences, the longest-running citizen dialogue between U.S. and Russian (formerly Soviet) citizens. The Dartmouth Conference worked to open channels to transmit and clarify perspectives when communication among Russian (formerly Soviet) and United States officials broke down.

Sustained Dialogue Campus Network 
The Sustained Dialogue Campus Network (SDCN), a project of the Sustained Dialogue Institute founded in 2003, is a training and consulting hub for the international network of campuses running Sustained Dialogues. SDCN began during Saunders' time on the board of trustees at Princeton University. Saunders and Princeton University undergraduates David Tukey and Teddy Nemeroff worked together to apply the Sustained Dialogue methodology to addressing race-based conflicts at Princeton, and their collaboration spread to the University of Virginia, and developed into the Campus Network.

Housed by the Sustained Dialogue Institute, SDCN involves students from dozens of campuses in twelve countries who work to improve intergroup relations and campus climate. The focus of any Sustained Dialogue program is relationship building across lines of difference and facilitating honest dialogue between students, faculty, staff, and administrators. SDCN trains campus communities in facilitation and Sustained Dialogue moderation, as well as inclusive leadership skills and conflict resolution. Active programs send students to annual dialogue conferences at local chapters or at SDCN headquarters in Washington, D.C.

National Dialogue Awards 
Each year, the Sustained Dialogue Institute awards a person whose life has "been powerfully marked by the principles and values of Sustained Dialogue." In addition to the primary awardee, SDI selects at least two members of the Sustained Dialogue Campus network to receive the award.

Impact 
A study published by the Journal of Peace Research showed that Sustained Dialogue had a positive effect on decreasing mistrust and increasing the level of trust between people of different ethnic origins. However, participation in the dialogue program increased the sense of importance of ethnic identities as well as the perception of being ethnically discriminated and had no significant effect on game behavior.

Awards
 Characters Unite Award from the USA Network and Comcast, "2010" 
 The Walter and Leonore Annenberg Award for Excellence in Diplomacy from the American Academy of Diplomacy, "November 30, 3010"

See also 
 Dialogue
 Intergroup dialogue

References

External links
 

2003 establishments in the United States
Peace organizations based in the United States
International relations